Wayne Grubb (born c. 1938) is a former American football and baseball coach. He served as the head football coach at Samford University in Homewood, Alabama from 1969 to 1973 and the University of North Alabama in Florence, Alabama from 1977 to 1987, compiling a career college football coaching record of 109–53–9. Grubb was also the head baseball coach at Samford in 1968.

A native of Athens, Tennessee, Grubb attended the University of Tennessee, where played college football as a Guard and tackle for the Tennessee Volunteers under head coach Bowden Wyatt from 1958 to 1960. He was named to the Southeastern Conference's All-Sophomore team in 1958 and earned scholastic All-American honors as a senior in 1960. Grubb began his coaching career at Cordova High School in Cordova, Alabama, serving as head coach for five seasons, from 1961 to 1965, and leading his teams to combined record of 38–8–4. He spent three seasons, from 1966 to 1968, as the line coach as Stanford under John Lee Armstrong, before succeeding Armstrong as head coach in 1969.

Head coaching record

College football

References

Year of birth uncertain
1930s births
Living people
American football guards
American football tackles
Birmingham Americans coaches
Birmingham Vulcans coaches
North Alabama Lions football coaches
Samford Bulldogs baseball coaches
Samford Bulldogs football coaches
Tennessee Volunteers football coaches
High school football coaches in Alabama
Ice hockey executives
People from Athens, Tennessee
Coaches of American football from Tennessee
Players of American football from Tennessee
Baseball coaches from Tennessee